Déodat Gratet de Dolomieu, French geologist.
 Dolomieu, Isère, commune in the Isère department in southeastern France.